Geoff Fox (born July 26, 1950) is an Emmy-award winning  American television broadcast meteorologist, with his career and expertise the industry covering 4 decades. For 27 years of his career he was at the television station WTNH in New Haven, Connecticut, where he started in 1984 and was senior meteorologist until 2011, and later with WTIC-TV in Hartford, Connecticut, where he was the weeknight 5:00 and 11:00 p.m. meteorologist, reported science and technology stories for the 4:00 p.m. newscast and was host for a garden segment titled "Geoff's Garden". 
 
Fox, a New York City native graduated from Brooklyn Technical High School. He received a certificate in broadcast meteorology from Mississippi State University and holds a broadcast seal from the American Meteorological Society.

Television. 
In May, 1984 Fox started his meteorology career for the television station WTNH in New Haven, Connecticut, where he was then promoted to "senior meteorologist".

In 1995, in addition to working for WTNH, he began hosting the program Inside Space, a program on Syfy (SciFi Channel at the time).

In early 2011, after 27 years at WTNH, Fox was told that his contract would not be renewed and he then  proceeded to depart from the station. At first he was told by management that he would be able to complete the contract he had  with the station before the end of his tenure but that did not happen. His departure received national media attention due to the loyalty of WTNH viewers in addition to his long spanned career with the station.

In April 2011 he was then hired by Fox affiliate WTIC-TV, where he forecasted for the 5:00 P.M. and 11:00 P.M. weather segments,  as well as science reports weeknights at 4:00 P.M. He was dismissed  from the station after 19 months, for what the station identified as "inappropriate conduct". Fox lost nearly 2000 of his followers on Facebook following the scandal. Later Fox developed an Internet-based company for designing and building websites.

In mid-2013, Fox relocated to Southern California, and in January 2015, he joined NBC affiliate KMIR-TV in Palm Springs, where he served as the weeknight meteorologist from early 2015 until September 2015.

On August 19, 2015, Fox announced that he would be working as the on-air meteorologist for "News Channel Nebraska’s first station in Norfolk", with more stations on the way. He forecasts for News Channel Nebraska from his home studio weather center.

In the summer of 2017, an agreement was made between the management of WTNH-TV and Fox for him to return briefly to the News8 airwaves for a seven-week fill-in period, to forecast the weeknight newscasts which would be broadcast from his home studio in California. At the end of the temporary employment period, Fox made it very clear to WTNH-TV management that he was very interested in a permanent full-time position. Though, management  did extend an offer to Fox for the opportunity to stay on the air with WTNH-TV for a part-time position, he declined. He made a statement saying that the offer "wasn't a good fit" but that he was thankful for being given the "brief" opportunity to return to the airwaves at WTNH and to show his gratitude for all the support from the viewers throughout the years, as well as the personal level support during his bout with pancreatic cancer.

WTNH News Director Keith Connors said, "We are grateful for what Geoff did for WTNH during the 2017 summer including filing-in on weeknight newscasts due to temporary schedule shifting, and wish him nothing but the best in the future."

Fox is currently semi-retired  and his meteorology career transitioned to fully remote serving as Chief Meteorologist forecasting on-air for News Channel Nebraska, as well as newsy and other  various independent television markets and side projects from his home-built studio weather center thanks to the era of modern digital technology. Fox said  “With the set-up I'm using in my home studio, I can do the weather for literally any place in the world and deliver it with so little lag that on-air chatting with the news anchors is seamless."

https://www.newtek.com/blog/2016/03/01/the-work-at-home-weatherman-recipe-from-geoff-fox/

He enjoys creating weather maps in his spare time for various regions locally and worldwide as well as building websites.

References

External link
 Geoff Fox - Meteorologist for News Channel Nebraska.

1950 births
People from Queens, New York
Television personalities from New York City
Weather presenters
Living people
Brooklyn Technical High School alumni